Tamer Salah (born 3 April 1986) is a Palestinian professional footballer who plays as a center back for Hilal Al-Quds and the Palestine national team.

External links
 
 

1986 births
Living people
Palestinian footballers
Hilal Al-Quds Club players
Palestine international footballers
Association football defenders
2015 AFC Asian Cup players
Footballers at the 2014 Asian Games
2019 AFC Asian Cup players
Asian Games competitors for Palestine
West Bank Premier League players